PixelJunk Monsters is the second game in the PixelJunk series developed by Q-Games for the PlayStation 3. It was released worldwide on the PlayStation Store on January 24, 2008. The game was released for the PlayStation Portable under the title PixelJunk Monsters Deluxe.

PixelJunk Monsters Encore, an expansion pack for the game, was released on April 24, 2008 in Japan; May 8, 2008 in North America; and May 15, 2008 in Europe.

In May 2016, PixelJunk Monsters was released by Double Eleven for Wii U.

In 2018, PixelJunk Monsters 2 was released, incorporating 3D graphics and new features.

Gameplay

Gameplay in PixelJunk Monsters has similarities to various tower defense titles. The objective is to build defense towers along the enemies' path to keep them from reaching a hut, or base. Several small creatures dwell at the base. For each enemy that survives the defense towers and reaches the hut, one creature is killed. If all creatures are wiped out, the level is failed.

Towers have distinct attributes, such as rapid fire, long range, air-focused, etc. Destroyed enemies usually drop coins and occasionally give gems, which then can be used to upgrade and research new towers.

There are a total of 21 different levels (36 with the expansion pack) at 3 stages of difficulty. There are also 3 special stages that unlock unique abilities for the player character. Several "Trophy Challenges" were also added to the game after a patch.

Unlike more traditional tower defense games, the player controls a character around the screen, collecting coins and building towers. This replaces the standard cursor controls. A second player can also join in and assist in building towers.

Encore
The PixelJunk Monsters Encore expansion pack includes an additional 15 levels, including layouts inspired by classic arcade games such as Pac-Man and Space Invaders. There are also small tweaks to gameplay; for instance, the ice tower is unlocked at the beginning of every level and the Tesla tower is less expensive to purchase.

Deluxe
A new version of PixelJunk Monsters was available for the PlayStation Portable. Titled PixelJunk Monsters Deluxe, it has been described by Dylan Cuthbert as the "ultimate version" of the game. It contains all of the level content from the original game and its Encore expansion pack, as well as new levels, enemies, and towers. Additional music, videos, concept art, and other special features are also included.

Soundtrack

The music for the game was developed by Otograph. On May 22, 2008, a soundtrack album for the game titled Dive into PixelJunk Monsters was released via the PlayStation Store. It is the first audio album to be released through PSN.

Reception

The PlayStation 3 version of PixelJunk Monsters, Encore, Deluxe, and the Vita version of Ultimate received "favorable" reviews, while the PC version of Ultimate and the Wii U version of PixelJunk Monsters received "average" reviews, according to the review aggregation website Metacritic.

References

External links
 PixelJunk Monsters official website
 PixelJunk Monsters Deluxe official website
 
 
 
 

2007 video games
MacOS games
Linux games
PlayStation 3 games
PlayStation Network games
PlayStation Portable games
PlayStation Vita games
Sony Interactive Entertainment games
Strategy video games
Tower defense video games
Video games developed in Japan
Video games with expansion packs
Wii U eShop games
Windows games
Double Eleven (company) games
Multiplayer and single-player video games
Q-Games games